is a dam in Naganohara, Agatsuma District, Gunma Prefecture, Japan. Construction began in 1967, with effective completion in October 2019 and the official opening on 1 April 2020. 

Planning for the dam began in 1952, and it was planned to be completed by 2015. The dam's construction had seen sustained local opposition and a ballooning budget, and a change of National government in 2009 resulted in the project being halted, being about 70% completed at the time. Another change of government in 2012 resulted in the project being revived and subsequently completed.

Construction required the relocation of part of the Agatsuma Line, several roads and affected residents.

References
This article incorporates material from the corresponding article in the Japanese Wikipedia.

Dams in Gunma Prefecture